Justice Sedgwick may refer to:

Samuel H. Sedgwick, associate justice of the Nebraska Supreme Court
Theodore Sedgwick, associate justice of the Massachusetts Supreme Judicial Court